The Finished Work is a doctrine associated with Pentecostals of the Finished Work Pentecostal tradition, that locates sanctification at the time of conversion; afterward the converted Christian progressively grows in grace. This is contrary to the Wesleyan doctrine of entire sanctification that locates complete sanctification in a definite second work of grace which Holiness Pentecostals (Methodistic Pentecostals) teach is a necessary prerequisite to receive the baptism in the Holy Spirit. The term finished work arises from the aphorism "It's a Finished Work at Calvary", referring to both salvation and sanctification. Though the term is used within Pentecostal Christianity, it is not exclusively a Pentecostal doctrine.

The doctrine arose as one of the "new issues" in the early Pentecostal revivals in the United States. The dispute surrounding it was called the Finished Work Controversy which split the Pentecostal movement into Wesleyan and non-Wesleyan doctrinal orientations, known respectively as Holiness Pentecostals and Finished Work Pentecostals.

Controversy

Background 
John Wesley advocated Christian perfection that held that while sanctification was indeed a definite work that was to follow conversion, it did not precipitate sinless perfection. Wesley drew on the idea of theosis to suggest that sanctification would cause a change in motivation that if nurtured would lead to a gradual perfecting of the believer. Thus while it was physically possible for a sanctified believer to sin, he or she would be empowered to choose to avoid sin.

Wesley's teachings and Methodism gave birth to the holiness movement. Most holiness advocates taught that sanctification had both instantaneous and progressive dimensions. They taught the availability of entire sanctification, which was a post-conversion experience. In this "second definite work of grace", the inclination to sin was removed and replaced by perfect love. The state of entire sanctification allowed the believer to turn his or her attention outward toward the advancement of the gospel. In contrast, the state of partial sanctification was said to turn the believer's attention to the interior spiritual struggle for holiness which in turn limited his or her usefulness to the church and society.

In time, significant Irvingite and Calvinist leaders became thoroughly embedded in the movement. These included Charles Finney, William Boardman and Dwight L. Moody. These Reformed evangelicals differed from their Wesleyan counterparts in that they rejected the holiness concept of a "second blessing" instead focusing on an "overcoming" life. In Britain, proponents of the importance of sanctifiation, centered around the Keswick Convention, developed the higher life movement. This was most dramatically evinced in the formation of the Christian and Missionary Alliance.

In the United States, the holiness movement arose primarily within Methodism, though it made an impact on the Quaker tradition, as well as in certain Anabaptist, Baptist and Restorationist denominations. When Pentecostalism emerged as a distinct movement, it was through Wesleyan-Arminian ministers such as Charles Parham and William J. Seymour.

Articulation and opposition
In 1910, William Howard Durham preached a sermon entitled "the Finished Work of Calvary" at a midwestern Pentecostal convention. His finished work teaching "sought to 'nullify' the understanding of sanctification as wholly realized in the believer by a crisis experience subsequent to and distinct from conversion". This teaching began the controversy that divided the Pentecostal movement into a three-stage and two-stage Pentecostalism. Three-stage Pentecostalism held the Wesleyan view that there are three distinct experiences of grace—conversion, sanctification, and baptism in the Holy Spirit. Two-stage Pentecostalism, which was the non-Wesleyan view held by Durham, held that sanctification was a lifelong process that began at conversion, thus this view only professed two stages—conversion and Spirit baptism.

Durham wrote in his magazine, The Pentecostal Testimony:

Converts began to share their beliefs in meetings and councils in the western United States where the Azusa Movement and its emphasis on sanctification as a definite experience was seen as orthodoxy, and any deviation was viewed with suspicion. This took the form of family members and friends who frequented various revival and camp meetings in the eastern US returning home to the Northwest and attempting to share their understanding of the “new doctrine.” The popularist version suggested that sanctification was not a requirement for Spirit baptism. This was viewed as a dangerous and fallacious polemic by the majority who assumed that anyone who had received the Pentecostal Blessing had in fact been sanctified and as an outright heresy by those who had slipped into the entire sanctification camp. In either case, proponents of the finished work were seen as contentious and were in many cases officially shunned to the point of dividing families.

The dispute grew more heated in February 1911 when Durham went to Los Angeles where he was prohibited from preaching at the Upper Room and Azusa Street Missions. He was able to hold services at the Kohler Street Mission where he attracted 1000 people on Sundays and around 400 on weekdays. Durham died that same year, but the controversy surrounding finished work persisted.

Outcome
The effect of the controversy was that the young Pentecostal movement was split between Wesleyan-holiness and non-Wesleyan Reformed evangelicals. The finished work gained the greatest support from the independent and unorganized urban churches and missions. The Pentecostal denominations centered in the American South were the most resistant to the new doctrine. Today, these Holiness Pentecostal denominations (Apostolic Faith Church, Church of God (Cleveland), Church of God in Christ, Free Gospel Church and Pentecostal Holiness Church) and their seminaries (such as the Free Gospel Bible Institute) retain a belief in the doctrine of entire sanctification—the second work of grace. 

Despite the resistance of Wesleyan Pentecostals, however, finished work adherents were successful in persuading many Pentecostals of the validity of their view. As a result, most of the Pentecostal denominations founded after 1911 adhered to the finished work doctrine. This can be seen in Finished Work Pentecostal denominations such as the Assemblies of God, the International Church of the Foursquare Gospel,Open Bible Churches, and virtually all Oneness Pentecostal denominations.

References

History of Christianity in the United Kingdom
Pentecostalism in the United States
Christian revivals
Evangelical theology
20th-century Protestantism
Finished Work Pentecostals